Gowthorpe is a hamlet in the East Riding of Yorkshire, England.

Gowthorpe forms part of the civil parish of Bishop Wilton.

From 1886 Gowthorpe was part of the civil parish of Youlthorpe with Gowthorpe which was abolished on 1 April 1935 with the creation of the civil parish of Bishop Wilton.

References

External links

 

Villages in the East Riding of Yorkshire